Margarethe Casimirowna Schadursky-Sternberg, known as Kasia von Szadurska (23 February 1886, Moscow - 3 April 1942, Berlin) was a German Expressionist painter, illustrator, and graphic artist.

Life and work 

She came to Germany at the age of four, as the adoptive child of a family named Sternberg, near Dresden. In 1903 she went to Düsseldorf, where she spent a year and a half taking drawing lessons from Willy Spatz. In 1905, her family moved to Hamburg.

Shortly after her arrival, she met a law student; Otto Ehinger from Meersburg. In 1910, after his graduation, they were married in Niedergrund, a resort town in "Bohemian Switzerland". Although his degree was in law, he earned his living as a publicist and travel journalist. In 1914, he moved to Meersburg to avoid military service. Kasia settled nearby in Konstanz, where she was engaged in making postcards. He apparently had to keep their marriage a secret.

After his mother-in-law's death in 1916, Ehinger took over his family's brewery business. Later, he became involved in politics. A minor scandal occurred when his opponents noticed that he went to Konstanz every weekend, and his secret was revealed. As a result, in 1919, he was forced to give up his candidacy for a seat in the Landtag. They continued living apart until 1922, when she moved to Meersburg and opened a studio. They were divorced in 1935. Although the reasons for the divorce were probably numerous, the blame was put on her, for having an alleged affair with a local artist named Johannes Kutscher. The custody of their two teenage sons was awarded to Ehinger.

A year before the divorce, she had returned to Konstanz and, once again, began producing portraits. With the rise of National Socialism, she was unable to sell her works publicly, and was entirely dependent on private commissions. These included portrait studies of the dancer, Tatjana Barbakoff, who would die at Auschwitz. Most of them were returned a year later. 

Toward the end of 1937, her clientele shifted to Berlin, making it necessary to travel back and forth frequently. In 1940, following an exhibition with the Verein der Berliner Künstlerinnen, she decided to live there; settling in the Wilmersdorf district. By then, her health had already begun to decline. Medical records from her estate indicate that a breast amputation was performed. At the beginning of 1942, she was hospitalized, and died a few months later, aged fifty-six.

References

Further reading 
 Brigitte Rieger-Benkel: "Kasia von Szadurska. Zwischen Sinnlichkeit und Abgrund", In:  2009, pp.51–62
 Susanne Satzer-Spree: "Kasia von Szadurska – Porträt einer künstlerischen Frau im „Felsennestchen“ am Bodensee", In: Leben am See. Nr. 10, 1992/1993, pp.172–175
 Barbara Stark: "Kasia von Szadurska. Eine Künstlerin jenseits der Konventionen", In: Allmende 2008.
 Brigitte Rieger-Benkel, Barbara Stark: Kasia von Szadurska (1986–1942) – Leidenschaft und Leid, exhibition catalog, Städtische Wessenberg-Galerie and Städtische Galerie Neues Schloss Meersburg, 2009,

External links 

 

1886 births
1942 deaths
20th-century German painters
German portrait painters
Women painters
Baltic German people from the Russian Empire
Deaths from breast cancer
Artists from Moscow
Emigrants from the Russian Empire to Germany